Estefanía Correia (born 2 January 1994), known as professionally as NIA, is a Spanish singer and actress, known for being the winner of the 2020 edition of the Operación Triunfo contest.

Biography
Born to a Bissau-Guinean father and a Canarian mother, Correia has worked as a singer in the musical El Rey León and has worked in Ibiza as an animator in a show. She has also sung in the Choir of the Gran Canaria Philharmonic Orchestra.

During the RTVE competition, Correia stood out for her quality and voice, which is why she was never nominated to leave the program. In addition, she was the first finalist and winner of the talent show. Her performances stood out for rhythm and movement, with intricate choreography very well executed.

During the contest, Correia released her first single, Ocho Maravillas (Eight Wonders). In July 2021, she released her first EP, titled Cuídate (Take Care). The introductory single was the song Malayerba. Later that Autumn, it was announced that she would participate in the 9th season of the contest Tu cara me suena, by Antena 3.

Discography

EP 
 Cuídate (2021)

Singles 
 Ocho Maravillas (2020)
 Me Muero de Risa with Nyno Vargas (2022)
 Cómo están las cosas with María Peláe (2022)
 Tulum with Gente de Zona and JC El Diamante (2022)
 Te Quedaste Solo with Edurne (2022)
 Vuelvo a caer with Pepe Bernabé (2022)
 Pisar el Cielo with Deichmann SE (2022)
 Candela with Rocco Hunt and Lennis Rodríguez (2022)
 Caminito de Lamento (2022)

Filmography

References

External links

1994 births
Living people
Spanish people of Bissau-Guinean descent
People from Las Palmas
Spanish television actresses
Spanish women pop singers
21st-century Spanish women singers
21st-century Spanish singers
Star Academy participants
Star Academy winners
Operación Triunfo contestants